Jewel in the lotus may refer to:

Philosophy
 Om mani padme hum, a Sanskrit mantra influential to Buddhism

Literature
 The Jewel in The Lotus, a 1959 compilation of orientalist erotica by Allen Edwardes
 Jewel in the Lotus, a 1987 textbook on tantra yoga by Sunyata Saraswati and Bodhi Avinasha

Music
 The Jewel of the Lotus, a track on Ramasutra's 1999 electronic album East Infection
 Jewel in the Lotus, a 1987 religious album by The Bahá'í House of Worship
 The Jewel in the Lotus (album), a 1974 jazz album by Bennie Maupin

Theater
 The Jewel in the Lotus, a 2007 production by Kriyananda